The IBM PS/1 is a brand for a line of personal computers that marked IBM's return to the home market in 1990, five years after the IBM PCjr. It was replaced by the IBM Aptiva in September 1994.

Position among IBM's PC brands
The PS/1 line was created for new computer users and was sold in consumer electronics stores alongside comparable offerings from Compaq, Hewlett-Packard, Packard Bell, and others. American PS/1 models came with a modem installed so users could access online IBM help services, which were provided by partnerships with Prodigy and Quantum.

Like the PCjr, the PS/1's name suggested a more limited machine than IBM's business line, the PS/2.  However, unlike the PS/2, the PS/1 was based upon architecture closer to the AT and compatibles, for example using ISA, plain VGA, and IDE. Although the first models used custom-designed components and design, later desktop and tower models used mostly standard components. The earlier models included a ROM with IBM's PC DOS and a graphical shell, however the system was compatible with other DOS implementations and the shell could be installed on the hard drive. Later models included a feature called "Rapid Resume" which gave the computers the ability to go into standby mode as well as a hibernation function.  There were several form factors used during the PS/1's production, with the 2133 and 2155 cases used for several model years while the 2168 tower case was offered later in later models of the PS/1 lineup:
 2011 Proprietary design, power supply is within CRT
 2121 Proprietary design, power supply is within CRT, up to two available ISA slots
 2123 Limited-production model. Based on IBM PS/2 model 30 case, three available ISA slots
 2133 Desktop case. The 3x3 references the available slots and drive bays.
 2155 Desktop case larger than 2133. The 5x5 references the available slots and drive bays. Including a 5.25" bay.
 2168 Tower unit. The 6x8 references the available slots and bays. Including 5.25" bays.

Models

Models 2011 and 2121
The original PS/1 (Model 2011), based on a 10 MHz Intel 80286 CPU, was designed to be easy to set up and use. It featured 512 KB of on-board memory (expandable to 1 MB or 2.5 MB with proprietary memory modules), built-in modem (in American models only) and an optional 30 MB or 40 MB hard disk. IBM also released a 5.25" disk drive unit, a $169 ISA Adapter Card Unit (ACU)  to install third-party expansion cards, and a $995 CD-ROM drive, based on a Western Digital SCSI chip, that fit underneath the case. Some of the lower-end PS/1 models suffered from very limited expansion capabilities, since they lacked standard ISA expansion slots.

The 2121 series computers used the same form factor as the 2011 series, but included up to two ISA slots inside the case. Memory could be expanded from 2MB to 6MB using a proprietary 4 MB memory module. The higher-end 2121 featured an Intel 80386SX processor running at 16 or 20 MHz.

The 2121 series PS/1 computers can be split into the following major hardware categories:

Monitors
IBM made the decision to put the DC power supply in the monitor, making use of third-party monitors difficult and essentially impractical and limiting the usefulness of the computer if the monitor needed service (similar to the problems of the Coleco Adam and Amstrad 1512 years earlier). Some models were sold with greyscale VGA monitors.  However, some hobbyists could manage to remap the pinouts to allow for third-party monitors.

"DOS in ROM"
Similar to a few Tandy 1000 models, the early 2011 and 2121 had an operating system (PC DOS 4.01) built into ROM, rather than loading it from a hard drive. The ROM disk would then load a "4-quad" screen which allowed users to access help, rapidly launch pre-installed software, connect online, and access files on the hard drive. It was possible to have the computer boot from the hard drive if the operating system was upgraded, and IBM provided a DOS 6.22-compatible version of the "4-quad" program that could be launched from the hard drive if users wished to continue using it.

Model 2133

The 2133 series PS/1 computers can be split into the following major hardware categories:

Post-"DOS in ROM" models
On May 11, 1993, IBM introduced a "new generation" of the PS/1 line. Later PS/1s featured standard LPX-architecture motherboard. Many of these later PS/1s shipped from the factory with MS-DOS and Microsoft Windows, rather than IBM's PC DOS or OS/2. An early 2133 model did come preloaded with OS/2 2.1. This was because IBM targeted OS/2 for high-end computing machines with more power.

Discontinuation
The PS/1 line was discontinued in 1994 and replaced with the Aptiva line, which was architecturally very similar to the later models of the PS/1, but with a more marketing-friendly name. Aptivas were sold in the United States until early 2000, when price pressures made the line unprofitable and IBM withdrew from the retail desktop PC market entirely.

See also
 IBM PC
 IBM PC compatible (IBM PC clone)
 List of IBM products
 PS/2
 ThinkPad
 ThinkCentre
 IBM Aptiva

References

External links
 IBM Archives: IBM PS/1

PS/1
Products introduced in 1990
8086-based home computers
Computer-related introductions in 1990